The 2019 CONCACAF League (officially the 2019 Scotiabank CONCACAF League for sponsorship purposes) was the third edition of the CONCACAF League, a football club competition organized by CONCACAF, the regional governing body of North America, Central America, and the Caribbean.

The tournament was expanded from 16 to 22 teams for the 2019 edition, with the addition of a preliminary round. The six new entrants were five teams from Central America, which had previously directly qualified for the CONCACAF Champions League, and a team from Canada playing in the Canadian Premier League, bringing the total number of teams playing in the CONCACAF League/Champions League from 31 to 32. Moreover, a total of six teams now qualified from the CONCACAF League to the CONCACAF Champions League, meaning that the winners of the 2019 CONCACAF League and the next best five teams qualified for the 2020 CONCACAF Champions League.

Saprissa defeated Motagua in the final to win their first CONCACAF League. Herediano were the title holders, but were eliminated by Waterhouse in the Round of 16.

Qualification
A total of 22 teams participated in the CONCACAF League:
North American Zone: 1 team (from one association)
Central American Zone: 18 teams (from seven associations)
Caribbean Zone: 3 teams (from two or three associations)

Therefore, teams from either 10 or 11 out of the 41 CONCACAF member associations could participate in the CONCACAF League.

North America
The one berth for the North American Zone (NAFU) was allocated to the Canadian Soccer Association through the Canadian Premier League. As the inaugural 2019 Canadian Premier League season was not scheduled to finish by the start of the 2019 CONCACAF League, the Canadian CONCACAF League berth for this season was decided by the winners of the home and away matches in the Canadian Premier League spring season between FC Edmonton, Forge FC, and Valour FC, the three "inaugural teams" of the Canadian Premier League. They were the second Canadian representative included in CONCACAF competitions, besides the Canadian Championship champions which qualified for the CONCACAF Champions League. In future seasons, the previous year's Canadian Premier League champions would qualify for the CONCACAF League.

Central America
The 18 berths for the Central American Football Union (UNCAF), which consisted of seven member associations, were allocated as follows: three berths for each of Costa Rica, El Salvador, Guatemala, Honduras, Panama, two berths for Nicaragua, and one berth for Belize.

All of the leagues of Central America employed a split season with two tournaments in one season, so the following teams qualified for the CONCACAF League:
In the league of Costa Rica, both champions, and the non-champions with the best aggregate record, qualified. If there was any team which were champions of both tournaments, the non-champions with the second best aggregate record qualified.
In the leagues of El Salvador, Guatemala, Honduras, and Panama, both champions, and the runners-up with the better aggregate record (or any team which were runners-up of both tournaments), qualified. If there was any team which were finalists of both tournaments, the runners-up with the worse aggregate record qualified. If there were any two teams which were finalists of both tournaments, the semi-finalists with the best aggregate record qualified.
In the league of Nicaragua, both champions qualified. If there was any team which were champions of both tournaments, the runners-up with the better aggregate record (or any team which were runners-up of both tournaments) qualified.
In the league of Belize, the champions with the better aggregate record (or any team which were champions of both tournaments) qualified.

If teams from any Central American associations were excluded, they were replaced by teams from other Central American associations, with the associations chosen based on results from previous CONCACAF League and CONCACAF Champions League tournaments.

Caribbean
The three berths for the Caribbean Football Union (CFU), which consisted of 31 member associations, were allocated via the CONCACAF Caribbean Club Championship and CONCACAF Caribbean Club Shield, the first-tier and second-tier subcontinental Caribbean club tournaments. Since 2018, the CONCACAF Caribbean Club Championship was open to teams from professional leagues, where they could qualify as champions or runners-up of their respective association's league in the previous season, while the CONCACAF Caribbean Club Shield was open to teams from non-professional leagues, where they could qualify as champions of their respective association's league in the previous season.

Besides the champions of the CONCACAF Caribbean Club Championship which qualified for the CONCACAF Champions League, the runners-up and third-placed team of the CONCACAF Caribbean Club Championship, and the winners of a playoff between the fourth-placed team of the CONCACAF Caribbean Club Championship and the champions of the CONCACAF Caribbean Club Shield, qualified for the CONCACAF League. For the champions of the CONCACAF Caribbean Club Shield to be eligible for the playoff, they had to comply with the minimum CONCACAF Club Licensing requirements for the CONCACAF League.

Teams
The following 22 teams (from eleven associations) qualify for the tournament.
Ten teams enter in the round of 16: two each from Costa Rica, Honduras, and Panama, and one each from El Salvador, Guatemala, Nicaragua, and the Caribbean.
Twelve teams enter in the preliminary round: two each from El Salvador, Guatemala, and the Caribbean, and one each from Canada, Costa Rica, Honduras, Panama, Nicaragua, and Belize.

Notes

Draw

The draw for the 2019 CONCACAF League was held on 30 May 2019, at 20:00 Eastern Time (18:00 local time), at the Grand Tikal Futura Hotel in Guatemala City, Guatemala.

The draw determined each tie in the preliminary round (numbered 1 through 6) between a team from Pot 1 and a team from Pot 2, each containing six teams. The "Bracket Position Pots" (Pot A and Pot B) contained the bracket positions numbered 1 through 6 corresponding to each tie. The teams from Pot 1 were assigned a bracket position from Pot A and the teams from Pot 2 were assigned a bracket position from Pot B. Teams from the same association could not be drawn against each other in the preliminary round except for "wildcard" teams which replaced a team from another association.

The draw also determined each tie in the round of 16 (numbered 1 through 8) between a team from Pot 3 and a team from Pot 4, each containing eight teams, with the six preliminary round winners, whose identity was not known at the time of the draw, in Pot 4. The "Bracket Position Pots" (Pot A and Pot B) contained the bracket positions numbered 1 through 8 corresponding to each tie. The teams from Pot 3 were assigned a bracket position from Pot A and the teams from Pot 4 were assigned a bracket position from Pot B.

The seeding of teams was based on the CONCACAF Club Index. The CONCACAF Club Index, instead of ranking each team, was based on the on-field performance of the teams that had occupied the respective qualifying slots in the previous five editions of the CONCACAF League and CONCACAF Champions League. To determine the total points awarded to a slot in any single edition of the CONCACAF League or CONCACAF Champions League, CONCACAF used the following formula:

Teams qualified for the CONCACAF League based on criteria set by their association (e.g., tournament champions, runners-up, cup champions), resulting in an assigned slot (e.g., CRC1, CRC2) for each team.

The 22 teams were distributed in the pots as follows:

Notes

Format
In the CONCACAF League, the 22 teams played a single-elimination tournament. Each tie was played on a home-and-away two-legged basis.
In the preliminary round, round of 16, quarter-finals, and semi-finals, the away goals rule was applied if the aggregate score was tied after the second leg. If still tied, the penalty shoot-out was used to determine the winner (Regulations II, Article G).
In the final, the away goals rule was not applied, and extra time was played if the aggregate score was tied after the second leg. If the aggregate score was still tied after extra time, the penalty shoot-out would be used to determine the winner (Regulations II, Article H).

Schedule
The schedule of the competition was as follows.

Times are Eastern Time, as listed by CONCACAF (local times are in parentheses):
Times up to 2 November 2019 (preliminary round, round of 16, quarter-finals, and semi-finals) are Eastern Daylight Time, i.e., UTC−4.
Times thereafter (final) are Eastern Standard Time, i.e., UTC−5.

Bracket
{{#invoke:RoundN|main|columns=5|3rdplace=no
|style       = font-size:80%
|score-boxes = 3
|team-width  = 180
|nowrap      = yes
|omit_blanks = yes
|flex_tree   = yes
|skipmatch   = 2;4;6;8;10;12-16
|RD1         = Preliminary round
|RD2         = Round of 16
|RD3         = Quarter-finals
|RD4         = Semi-finals
|RD5         = Final

|| Forge FC|2|0|2| Antigua GFC|1|0|1
|| Comunicaciones|2|1|3| Marathón|1|1|2
|| Belmopan Bandits|1|1|2| Saprissa|3|3|6
|| Robinhood (a)|0|1|1| Capoise|0|1|1
|| Alianza|5|1|6| San Francisco|1|0|1
|| Real Estelí|2|0|2| Santa Tecla (a)|1|1|2

|| Forge FC|1|1|2| Olimpia|0|4|4
|| Comunicaciones|2|0|2| Guastatoya|1|0|1
|| Saprissa|2|0|2| Águila|0|1|1
|| Robinhood|1|1|2| Independiente|1|2|3
|| Alianza|2|0|2| Tauro|0|1|1
|| Santa Tecla|0|0|| San Carlos (p)|0|0|
|| Waterhouse (p)|1|1|| Herediano|1|1|
|| Managua|1|1|2| Motagua|2|1|3

|| Olimpia|2|0|2| Comunicaciones|0|0|0|| Saprissa|3|1|4| Independiente|2|0|2|| Alianza|2|0|2| San Carlos|0|1|1|| Waterhouse|0|0|0| Motagua|2|0|2|| Olimpia|2|1|3| Saprissa|0|4|4|| Alianza|1|0|1| Motagua|1|3|4|| Saprissa|1|0|1| Motagua|0|0|0'}}

Preliminary round
In the preliminary round, the matchups were decided by draw: PR-1 through PR-6. The teams from Pot 1 in the draw hosted the second leg.

Summary
The first legs were played on 30 July – 1 August, and the second legs were played on 6–8 August 2019.

|}

MatchesAlianza won 6–1 on aggregate.1–1 on aggregate. Robinhood won on away goals.Saprissa won 6–2 on aggregate.Forge FC won 2–1 on aggregate.Comunicaciones won 3–2 on aggregate.2–2 on aggregate. Santa Tecla won on away goals.Round of 16
In the round of 16, the matchups were decided by draw: R16-1 through R16-8. The teams from Pot 3 in the draw hosted the second leg.

Summary
The first legs were played on 20–22 August, and the second legs were played on 27–29 August 2019.

|}

MatchesMotagua won 3–2 on aggregate.2–2 on aggregate. Waterhouse won 7–6 on penalties.0–0 on aggregate. San Carlos won 4–2 on penalties.Alianza won 2–1 on aggregate.Independiente won 3–2 on aggregate.Saprissa won 2–1 on aggregate.Comunicaciones won 2–1 on aggregate.Olimpia won 4–2 on aggregate.Quarter-finals
In the quarter-finals, the matchups were determined as follows:
QF1: Winner R16-1 vs. Winner R16-2
QF2: Winner R16-3 vs. Winner R16-4
QF3: Winner R16-5 vs. Winner R16-6
QF4: Winner R16-7 vs. Winner R16-8
The winners of round of 16 matchups 1, 3, 5, 7 hosted the second leg.

Summary
The first legs were played on 24–26 September, and the second legs were played on 1–3 October 2019.

|}

MatchesMotagua won 2–0 on aggregate.Alianza won 2–1 on aggregate.Saprissa won 4–2 on aggregate.Olimpia won 2–0 on aggregate.Semi-finals
In the semi-finals, the matchups were determined as follows:
SF1: Winner QF1 vs. Winner QF2
SF2: Winner QF3 vs. Winner QF4
The semi-finalists in each tie which had the better performance in previous rounds (excluding preliminary round) hosted the second leg.

Summary
The first legs were played on 24 October, and the second legs were played on 31 October 2019.

|}

MatchesMotagua won 4–1 on aggregate.Saprissa won 4–3 on aggregate.Final

In the final (Winner SF1 vs. Winner SF2), the finalists which had the better performance in previous rounds (excluding preliminary round) hosted the second leg.

Summary
The first leg was played on 7 November, and the second leg was played on 26 November 2019.

|}

MatchesSaprissa won 1–0 on aggregate.''

Top goalscorers

Qualification to CONCACAF Champions League
Starting from the round of 16, teams were ranked based on their results (excluding preliminary round) using the following criteria (Regulations II, Article I):
Points (3 points for a win, 1 point for a draw, 0 points for a loss, except that teams advancing via a penalty shootout were considered to have won the match and thus earned 3 points);
Goal difference;
Goals scored;
Away goals scored;
Wins;
Away wins;
Disciplinary points (1 point for yellow card, 3 points for indirect red card, 4 points for direct red card, 5 points for yellow card and direct red card);
Drawing of lots

Based on the ranking, the top six teams, i.e., champions, runners-up, both losing semi-finalists, and best two losing quarter-finalists, qualified for the 2020 CONCACAF Champions League.

Awards

The following awards were given at the conclusion of the tournament:

See also
2020 CONCACAF Champions League

Notes

References

External links

 
2019
2
2020 CONCACAF Champions League
July 2019 sports events in North America
August 2019 sports events in North America
September 2019 sports events in North America
October 2019 sports events in North America
November 2019 sports events in North America